Grenagh is a village close to Mallow in County Cork, Ireland. It is situated approximately 1 km from the main Cork-Limerick N20 road. The village is served by St. Lachteen's Catholic Church. The local Gaelic Athletic Association, Grenagh GAA, have twice won the Cork Intermediate A Football Championship. Grenagh is part of the Cork North-Central (Dáil constituency).

People
 Tom Kenny,  hurling coach and inter-county hurler

See also
 List of towns and villages in Ireland

References

Towns and villages in County Cork